The Dormouse is a character in "A Mad Tea-Party", Chapter VII  from the 1865 novel Alice's Adventures in Wonderland by Lewis Carroll.

History

The Dormouse sat between the March Hare and the Mad Hatter. They were using him as a cushion while he slept when Alice arrives at the start of the chapter.

The Dormouse is always falling asleep during the scene, waking up every so often, for example to say:

He also tells a story about three young sisters who live in a treacle well, live on treacle, and draw pictures of things beginning with M, such as mousetraps, memory and muchness.

He later appears, equally sleepy, at the Knave of Hearts' trial and voices resentment at Alice for growing, and his last interaction with any character is his being "suppressed" (amongst other things) by the Queen for shouting out that tarts are made of treacle.

Disney version

The character also appears in Disney's Alice in Wonderland. As in the book, he is sleepy and lazy, but unlike in the book, he sings Twinkle, Twinkle, Little Bat instead of telling his story about mouse sisters to entertain the tea-party participants.

He panics at the mention of the word "cat", much like The Mouse from the book, and needs to have jam spread on his nose in order to calm down. This first happens when Alice talks about her cat Dinah, causing the March Hare and the Mad Hatter to chase after it in order to administer the jam.

The Dormouse later appears as the second witness at Alice's trial, where two playing cards had to have the Queen of Hearts question it quietly. When Alice points out that the Cheshire Cat is on the Queen of Hearts' crown, the Queen of Hearts quotes "cat", causing the Dormouse to panic, with the March Hare, the Mad Hatter, and the King of Hearts running around trying to catch him, with comical results.

The Disney version of the character also appears in House of Mouse and Mickey's Magical Christmas: Snowed in at the House of Mouse.

Tim Burton's Alice in Wonderland version
   
In Tim Burton's 2010 Alice in Wonderland film, the Dormouse is a small, female mouse named Mallymkun. Unlike the sleepy character in the book, this Dormouse is an action-oriented swordfighter in training similar to the character Reepicheep from The Chronicles of Narnia. She is voiced by Barbara Windsor.

She is initially seen with the group Alice first meets in Wonderland, and saving Alice from the Bandersnatch by plucking out its eye. She is seen a second time at Thackery Earwicket, the March Hare's tea party having tea with the March Hare and the Mad Hatter.

She is seen a third time rescuing the Hatter from the Red Queen. She is seen a fourth time at the end, fighting the Red Queen's forces. She also appears in the movie's 2016 sequel in the beginning when Alice returns to Wonderland, and later when Time travels back to the past and encounters her, the Hatter and the March Hare having a tea party, which he curses to last forever after he realizes they are stalling him.

In other media
The Dormouse is played by Arte Johnson in the 1985 television film Alice in Wonderland. When he initially shows lack of movement at the mad tea party, Alice mistakes him for a stuffed animal. The Dormouse then quickly objects to Alice's statements.
The Dormouse appears in the live-action TV series Adventures in Wonderland, and is voiced by John Lovelady. He isn't sleepy, and is often seen popping out of his tea pot or other things. In one episode, he is the announcer of a sprinting event.
 The Dormouse appears in Dreamchild performed by Karen Prell and voiced by Julie Walters.
 Pandora Hearts in the anime and manga series Dormouse is a chain that puts people to sleep and Vincent Nightray is its contractor.
 The Dormouse makes an appearance in the video game American McGee's Alice, where he and the March Hare are held captive as the Mad Hatter's experimental subjects. He is tied to a dissection table and continues to fall asleep from the Hatter's medicines. 
The Dormouse appears again in the 2011 sequel Alice: Madness Returns, where he and the March Hare betray and dismantle the Mad Hatter as revenge for the events in American McGee's Alice and use his domain to construct the Infernal Train for the Dollmaker's plan to purge Wonderland.
Black Butler, in the OVA Ciel in Wonderland, Ronald Knox is the dormouse.
 In the SyFy TV Miniseries Alice, the Dormouse is a sidekick of the Hatter.
 Mallymkun the Dormouse appears as a playable character in the video game adaptation of Tim Burton's Alice in Wonderland.
The Dormouse appeared in the Sunsoft's 2006 mobile game . While prone to falling to sleep, Dormouse tries to be helpful to Ariko (the "Alice" of game) and treats her gently. In one of the bad endings, Dormouse gets killed by a twisted Cheshire Cat.
 The Dormouse appears as a member of the Mad T Party band at Disneyland's California Adventure Park. In the Mad T Party he is interpreted as a male rather than the 2010 film's female Mallymkun, who he is based on. He plays lead guitar and often scurries around with the March Hare on stage.
 The Dormouse was portrayed by Dudley Moore in the 1972 British musical film Alice's Adventures in Wonderland.
 The Dormouse was referenced in the fantasy series Once Upon a Time in Wonderland, a spin-off of Once Upon a Time. In the pilot episode, the White Rabbit misled Alice and the Knave of Hearts in saying that, while having tea with the Dormouse, he learned that Alice's true love Cyrus was alive. In reality, he received this information from the Red Queen.
 The Dormouse beckons to "Feed Your Head" in Grace Slick's "White Rabbit," recorded in 1967 by Jefferson Airplane on the "Surrealistic Pillow" album.

Cultural references 

The Dormouse's foremost recognition in popular culture stems from the American rock band Jefferson Airplane's song "White Rabbit", which dramatically repeats the line: "Remember what the dormouse said: feed your head, feed your head". The cadence of this enigmatic lyric has inspired references over the next century, including the title of John Markoff's 2005 book, What the Dormouse Said: How the 60s Counterculture Shaped the Personal Computer Industry.

References

Mice and rats in literature
Anthropomorphic mice and rats
Dormice
Lewis Carroll characters
Literary characters introduced in 1865